The 1953–54 Tercera División season was the 18th since its establishment.

Format 
111 clubs participated in 6 geographic groups.  The 6 group winners were promoted to the Segunda División.  The 6 runners up joined the 12th and 13th placed teams in Groups I and II of the Segunda División to form two groups of 5 clubs who each played 8 further matches. The winners and runners up of each group took their places in the Segunda División.

League tables

Group I

Group II

Group III

Group IV

Group V

Group VI

Promotion playoff

Group I

Note: Both Caudal and La Felguera retained their places in the Segunda División.

Group II

Note: San Fernando were promoted to the Segunda División and Murcia retained their place.

Season records
 Most wins: 25, Real Betis.
 Most draws: 12, Lugo and Arsenal.
 Most losses: 24, Cuatro Caminos.
 Most goals for: 115, San Fernando.
 Most goals against: 104, Cuatro Caminos.
 Most points: 57, Real Betis.
 Fewest wins: 7, Cuatro Caminos.
 Fewest draws: 1, Azkoyen, Rayo Vallecano, Aspense and Valdepeñas.
 Fewest losses: 4, Real Betis and Levante.
 Fewest goals for: 42, Lemos.
 Fewest goals against: 28, Real Betis.
 Fewest points: 0, Binéfar.

Notes

External links
RSSSF 
Futbolme 
Research by Asociación para la Recopilación de Estadísticas del Fútbol (AREFE)

Tercera División seasons
3
Spain